Glenn Carl Leonard (born June 11, 1947 in Washington, D.C.) is an American R&B and soul singer best remembered for serving as the first tenor/secondary lead singer of the Motown quintet The Temptations from 1975 to 1983, and for the last 15 years has toured with his Glenn Leonard's Temptations Revue.

Biography
Leonard recorded with the groups the Chancellors, Instant Groove and True Reflection before he was asked to replace ousted Temptations member Damon Harris (who'd replaced Ricky Owens). Leonard joined the group in 1975, just before they recorded the hit Shaky Ground. Leonard's most notable Temptations leads were on the 1980 single Power, and on the Christmas classic Silent Night from their 1980 Christmas album. He was replaced by Ron Tyson in 1983.

Leonard is a native of Washington D.C., second oldest of 8 children born 1947 to Gennie and Pearlie Leonard, natives of North Carolina. As a child, he was raised between Washington and North Carolina. He started singing at the age of six, and by age 13 he began to earn a living performing on stage, at parties and concerts, and as a recording artist. Leonard successfully established three groups by the time he was in his early 20s: The Chancellors, The Instant Groove, and The True Reflections. He was also a member of another popular and successful recording group from Washington called The Unifics. He recorded his first record with his first group, The Chancellors, on Cap City Records, a subsidiary of Scepter Records, and later his third group, The True Reflection, on Atlantic Records. The Temptations appeared on American Bandstand, The Midnight Special, Soul Train and other popular national programs.

Leonard then came to the attention of the Temptations in 1975.  He had a notable career as their first tenor and lead singer from 1975-1983 encompassing ten albums with the supergroup. His most noted songs include I’m on Fire, Go for It, The Best of Both Worlds, Eyes, Ever Ready Love, and Silent Night from their Christmas Album.

Leonard was a part of The Temptations "Reunion" tour and album in 1982, featuring The Classic Five lineup (excluding Paul Williams who had committed suicide in 1973 by shooting himself). After parting ways with the group in 1983 and replaced by Ron Tyson, Leonard became a born-again Christian, entered into full-time ministry and was licensed in 1986. He became ordained and received a doctorate degree in the early 1990s.

Currently, Leonard is touring with Glenn Leonard's Temptations Revue, also featuring former Temptations bass singer, Joe Herndon. Other members of this group are Kareem Ali, Andre Jackson and Joe Coleman, and is usually under the musical direction of maestro Ron Hasley. This group has performed throughout the world, including Europe and South America, since approximately 2000.

Leonard also tours extensively with Glenn Leonard Presents Hitsville Live, which is a full Motown Revue featuring both male and female lead singers.

Glenn was proudly inducted into the R&B Hall of Fame in 2013. 

Leonard recorded a duet of "Silent Night" with America's Got Talent season six winner Landau Eugene Murphy Jr. for Landau's "Christmas Made For Two" album, reprising his role as lead vocalist on the Temptations classic version of the holiday favorite.

Leonard was married for many years to former Solid Gold dancer Darcel Wynne.

Leonard has also released a solo album titled "Glenn Leonard Then & Now" with guest vocalist Jean Carne.

Leonard was portrayed by Benjamin J. Cain Jr. in the 1998 biographical television mini-series The Temptations, though he was not heavily focused upon, as the mini-series gave more attention to the Ruffin/Kendricks-era Temptations line up.

External links
 Official homepage for Glenn Leonard - lead singer from 1975 to 1983 - and his Temptations Revue
 Official homepage for Glenn Leonard Presents Hitsville Live
http://www.wpxi.com/news/entertainment/leonard-coleman-blunt/nh5M5/

References

The Temptations members
American rhythm and blues singers
African-American musicians
Singers from Washington, D.C.
1947 births
Living people
American soul singers
American tenors
American Christian clergy